George Francis "Doc" Medich (born December 9, 1948) is a former professional baseball player who pitched in the Major Leagues from 1972–1982. He was a medical student at the University of Pittsburgh, and acquired the nickname "Doc" during his early baseball career.

Early years
While in college, Medich (of Serbian descent) pitched for the Pitt baseball team and played tight end on the Pittsburgh Panthers football team.

Professional career

Draft and minors

Medich was drafted by the New York Yankees in the 30th round of the 1970 Major League Baseball draft, and spent three seasons as a starting pitcher in their farm system, going 21-13 over that span with a 2.27 ERA.

New York Yankees
Medich received a call to the majors in September , facing four batters in his major league debut, giving up two singles and two walks. He was also the last Yankee winning pitcher at the original Yankee Stadium, pitching a shutout on September 29, 1973 against the Detroit Tigers. In , Medich won a career high 19 games for the Yankees, tied with teammate Pat Dobson for most wins on the team. Following a  season in which he went 16-16 with a 3.50 ERA, the Yankees sent Medich to the Pittsburgh Pirates for Willie Randolph, Dock Ellis and Ken Brett on December 11, 1975.

Pittsburgh Pirates
Medich spent just one injury plagued season with his hometown Pirates, going 8-11 with a 3.52 ERA. Medich put his medical training to good use during a game on the 11th of April against the Philadelphia Phillies at Veterans Stadium. A 73-year-old spectator collapsed with a heart attack, and Medich performed cardiopulmonary resuscitation on the spectator.

1977 season
Medich was unhappy with his trade as he was a student at the University of Pittsburgh School of Medicine, and wished to remain near the school. He threatened to retire, but later joined the A's, and went 10-6 with a 4.69 ERA. As he was slated to become a free agent at the end of the season, A's owner Charlie Finley attempted to sign Medich to an extension. Unsuccessful, he sold Medich's contract to the expansion Seattle Mariners in September. He was 2-0 with a 3.63 ERA in three starts for the Mariners before being placed on waivers, and selected by the New York Mets. He made one start for the Mets, losing to the Pirates.

Texas Rangers
Medich signed as a Free Agent with the Texas Rangers following the season, going 9-8 with a 3.74 ERA his first season with the club. His best season was the strike shortened  season in which he went 10-6 with a 3.08 ERA, and tied for the AL lead with four shutouts with Richard Dotson, Ken Forsch, and Steve McCatty. In five seasons with the club, Medich went 50-43 with a 3.95 ERA.

Milwaukee Brewers
With the Rangers languishing in sixth place in the American League West, Medich's contract was sold to the Milwaukee Brewers, who were in first place in the American League East, on August 11, . On August 27, Rickey Henderson broke Lou Brock's record for most stolen bases in one season against the Brewers with Medich on the mound. Medich reached the post-season for the only time in his career as a member of the Brewers. His only post-season appearance came in game six of the 1982 World Series. Already down 7-0 to the St. Louis Cardinals, Medich entered in the sixth inning, and gave up six runs (four earned) in two innings of work.

Medical career
Medich entered the University of Pittsburgh School of Medicine in 1970 where he obtained his MD degree in 1977.

Twice during his baseball career, Medich went into the stands during a game to aid a fan who was suffering a heart attack. In 1976 in Philadelphia, he performed CPR and mouth-to-mouth resuscitation on a fan who died later that day. In a game on July 17, 1978, between the Texas Rangers and the Baltimore Orioles, he revived a man who was suffering a heart attack. The man survived and lived several more years.

Medich was charged in November 1983 with improperly prescribing Percodan and admitted into a substance abuse treatment program. At the time he was a resident in surgery at UPMC Children's Hospital of Pittsburgh. In 1984, he was sentenced to two years of probation and fined $5,000 in connection with those charges.

Medich was subsequently accused of having written twelve false prescriptions for painkillers in 1999. In 2001, he pleaded guilty to twelve counts of possession of a controlled substance. In March, he was sentenced to nine years of probation and voluntarily surrendered his right to prescribe painkillers.

The American Academy of Orthopaedic Surgeons voted to expel Medich.

References

External links
 

1948 births
Living people
New York Yankees players
Pittsburgh Pirates players
Oakland Athletics players
Seattle Mariners players
New York Mets players
Texas Rangers players
Milwaukee Brewers players
Baseball players from Pennsylvania
Major League Baseball pitchers
Pittsburgh Panthers baseball players
Pittsburgh Panthers football players
Oneonta Yankees players
Kinston Eagles players
West Haven Yankees players
Manchester Yankees players
American people of Serbian descent
People from Aliquippa, Pennsylvania
Players of American football from Pennsylvania
American orthopedic surgeons
University of Pittsburgh School of Medicine alumni